Wainwright station is on the Canadian National Railway mainline in Wainwright, Alberta. The station is served by Via Rail's The Canadian as a flag stop (48 hours advance notice required). The station building is permanently closed; passengers embark at a sign post, and tickets can be purchased online.

References

External links 
Via Rail Station Description

Via Rail stations in Alberta
Canadian National Railway stations in Alberta